Etheostoma corona , the crown darter, is a species of freshwater ray-finned fish, a darter from the subfamily Etheostomatinae, part of the family Percidae, which also contains the perches, ruffes and pikeperches. It is endemic to the eastern United States, where it is found in Tennessee and Alabama.

References

corona
Taxa named by Patrick A. Ceas
Taxa named by Lawrence M. Page
Fish described in 1992